Carson is an unincorporated community in Jefferson Davis County, Mississippi, United States. Carson has a post office with ZIP code 39427.

History
Carson was located in Covington County prior to the creation of Jefferson Davis County. A post office first opened under the name Carson in 1900. Carson is located on the former Illinois Central Gulf Railroad and was once home to six general stores, two sawmills, and multiple lumber camps.

Notable person
 Billy Harvey, member of the Mississippi State Senate from 1988 to 2006

References

Unincorporated communities in Jefferson Davis County, Mississippi
Unincorporated communities in Mississippi